Batemantown is an unincorporated community in Knox County, in the U.S. state of Ohio.

History
A post office called Batemantown was established in 1897, and remained in operation until 1903. The community was named for the local Bateman family who came from Vermont around 1815.

References

Unincorporated communities in Knox County, Ohio
1897 establishments in Ohio
Unincorporated communities in Ohio